The Ghana Federation of Disability Organizations, formerly Ghana Federation of the Disabled, is the umbrella body that advocates for the various disabled groups in Ghana. The federation is headed by Yaw Ofori Debrah.

External links
 Official website

References

Ministries and Agencies of State of Ghana
Disability organisations based in Ghana